Maarn is a railway station in the centre of Maarn, Netherlands, next to the A12. The station opened on 15 March 1845 and is located on the Amsterdam–Arnhem railway. The services are operated by Nederlandse Spoorwegen.

The station was moved 1 km east in 1972, and in 2005 had approximately 1,590 passengers per day.

Several kilometres further the Kesteren–Amersfoort railway branches off to Veenendaal and Rhenen.

Train services
The following services currently call at Maarn:
2x per hour local service (sprinter) Amsterdam - Utrecht - Rhenen
2x per hour local service (sprinter) Breukelen - Utrecht - Veenendaal Centrum

Bus service
Operated by Connexxion

82 - Amersfoort - Leusden - Woudenberg - Maarsbergen - Maarn - Station Maarn - Doorn (2x Per Hour, 1x Per Hour Saturdays)

This service stops 200m east of the station.

Gallery

External links
NS website 
Dutch Public Transport journey planner 

Railway stations in Utrecht (province)
Railway stations opened in 1845
Railway stations on the Rhijnspoorweg
Railway stations on the Veenendaallijn
Utrechtse Heuvelrug
Railway stations in the Netherlands opened in 1845